Rialton Grange was a monastic grange in St Columb Minor in Cornwall, UK, belonging to the priors of Bodmin.

References

Monasteries in Cornwall